The 2007–08 AHL season was the 72nd season of the American Hockey League. Twenty-nine teams played 80 games each in the schedule. The Chicago Wolves won their second Calder Cup, defeating the Wilkes-Barre/Scranton Penguins in the Calder Cup Final.

Team changes
 The dormant Utah Grizzlies relocate to Cleveland, Ohio, playing as the Lake Erie Monsters in the North Division. 
 The dormant Cincinnati Mighty Ducks relocate to Rockford, Illinois, playing as the Rockford IceHogs in the West Division, using the name of a previous United Hockey League franchise.
 The Omaha Ak-Sar-Ben Knights relocate to Moline, Illinois (Quad Cities), playing as the Quad City Flames in the West Division.

Standings
Complete standings available here.
 
Note: GP = Games played; W = Wins; L = Losses; OTL = Overtime losses; SL = Shootout losses; GF = Goals for; GA = Goals against; Pts = Points; Blue shade = clinched division, Green shade = clinched playoff spot

Eastern Conference

Western Conference

Scoring leaders

Note: GP = Games played; G = Goals; A = Assists; Pts = Points; PIM = Penalty Minutes

Calder Cup playoffs

In each division, the fourth-place team will play the first-place team in the division semifinals, while the second-place team plays the third-place team. 

There is one possible exception to the qualification rules in 2007–08: if the fifth-place team in the West Division finishes with more points than the fourth-place team in the North Division, it would cross over and compete in the North Division playoffs.
Thus, the San Antonio Rampage replace the Hamilton Bulldogs in the North Division playoffs.

All Star Classic
The 21st AHL All-Star Classic was played at the Broome County Veterans Memorial Arena in Binghamton, New York, on January 28, 2008.  The Canadian All-Stars defeated the Planet USA All-Stars 9–8 in a shootout. Teddy Purcell scored a hat trick, scored the winning shootout goal, and was awarded the MVP award.

Trophy and award winners

Team awards

Individual awards

See also
List of AHL seasons
 2007 in ice hockey
 2008 in ice hockey

References
AHL official site
AHL Hall of Fame
HockeyDB

 
American Hockey League seasons
2007–08 in American ice hockey by league
2007–08 in Canadian ice hockey by league